Clara Louise Bell (1886 – 1978) (also known as Clara Louise Janowsky) was an American miniature painter.

Early life and education

Bell was born in 1886 in Newton Falls, Ohio. She went to school at the Cleveland School of Art and at the Art Students League of New York. While at the Art Students League, she studied under Edith Stevenson Wright  (1883–1975)  and Henry Keller.

Career

She painted miniatures. She was a member of the American Society of Miniature Painters. She was awarded the Penton Medal in 1919 by the Cleveland Museum of Art. She married sculptor Bela Janowsky in 1943. She painted portraits of Franklin D. Roosevelt and Herbert Hoover for the collection of American presidents at Butler Institute of American Art.

Later life and legacy

She died in 1978.

Notable collections

Francine Serrano, 1924, watercolor on ivory, Smithsonian American Art Museum
Laura Newell Veissi, 1925, watercolor on ivory, Metropolitan Museum of Art

References

1886 births
1978 deaths
People from Newton Falls, Ohio
Art Students League of New York alumni
Portrait miniaturists
Painters from Ohio
American portrait painters
20th-century American painters
20th-century American women artists
Cleveland School of Art alumni